Grewia limae is a species of flowering plant in the family Malvaceae sensu lato or Tiliaceae or Sparrmanniaceae. It is found only in Mozambique.

References

limae
Endemic flora of Mozambique
Taxonomy articles created by Polbot